Corbie is a commune of the Somme département in northern France.

Corbie may also refer to:

Animals
 Corbie (bird) or Common raven
 Corbie (moth) (Oncopera intricata), a moth of Australia

Places
 Canton of Corbie, Somme, Hauts-de-France, France
 Corbie Abbey, a former Benedictine monastery in Corbie, Picardy, France
 Corbie Hill, New South Wales

People
 Saint Adalard of Corbie (751–827), adviser to Charlemagne and co-founder of Corvey Abbey
 Colette of Corbie (1381–1447), French abbess and foundress of the Colettine Poor Clares
 Pierre de Corbie (died after 1195), French troubadour
 Saint Radbert of Corbie (785–865), Carolingian theologian and abbot of Corbie Abbey
 Ratramnus of Corbie (died c. 868), Frankish monk
 Vielart de Corbie (13th century), French troubadour
 Wala of Corbie (c. 755–836), adviser to Charlemagne and co-founder of Corvey Abbey

See also
 Corby (disambiguation)